Sir Thomas George Skipwith, 4th Baronet (c. 1735 – 28 January 1790) of Newbold Revel Hall  was an English politician who sat in the House of Commons from 1769 to 1784.

He was the eldest son of Sir Francis Skipwith, 3rd Baronet (c. 1705–1778), of Newbold Revel. His mother Ursula, was the daughter of Thomas Cartwright MP, from Northamptonshire; her brother was William Cartwright MP. Skipwith was educated at Rugby School and at Trinity College, Cambridge.

He was elected as a Member of Parliament (MP) for Warwickshire at a by-election in 1769, to fill the vacancy caused by the death of William Throckmorton Bromley MP. A former member of the Birmingham Bean Club, he had been recommended in 1764 as a sound Tory, but fell in with the Rockingham Whigs and voted consistently with that faction. He was re-elected in 1774, but refused to stand again in 1780, when he was returned for the borough of Steyning in Sussex. He had been given that seat by Sir John Honywood, but the two men fell out and Skipwith was not re-elected in 1784.

He died in 1790. In 1785 he had married Selina, daughter of George Shirley and granddaughter of the 1st Earl Ferrers. They had no children, and the baronetcy which he inherited from his father in 1778 became extinct on his death.
His estates were left to his relative Sir Grey Skipwith, 8th Baronet.

References 

1735 births
Year of birth uncertain
1790 deaths
Baronets in the Baronetage of England
People from Stratford-on-Avon District
People educated at Rugby School
Alumni of Trinity College, Cambridge
Members of the Parliament of Great Britain for English constituencies
British MPs 1768–1774
British MPs 1774–1780
British MPs 1780–1784